Pari Saberi (born 21 March 1932 in Kerman) is an Iranian drama and theatre director and Knight of the French Ordre des Arts et des Lettres, awarded by French President Jacques Chirac.

She studied at Vaugirard Cinematography College which is one of the famous cinematographic higher education institutes of France.

Awards 
Ibn Sina (Avicenna) award from UNESCO (2003)
French Chevalier de l'Ordre des Arts et des Lettres (2004)

Filmography 
 Adobe and Mirror (1964)

References

External links
Saberi Awarded French Medal

Iranian theatre directors
Iranian dramatists and playwrights
People from Kerman
Recipients of the Legion of Honour
1932 births
Living people
People from Kerman Province